"Sweet and Innocent" is a single by British heavy metal band Diamond Head, released in 1980 by Media Records, a Wolverhampton-based label. It was a single A-side "Streets of Gold" as the B-Side, and was only available on 7". Both tracks eventually ended up on the re-released version of Diamond Head's 1980 debut Lightning to the Nations in 2001 by Sanctuary Records.

Track listing
 "Sweet and Innocent"
 "Streets of Gold"

Lineup
Brian Tatler
Sean Harris
Duncan Scott
Colin Kimberley

Charts

References 

1980 singles
Diamond Head (band) songs
1980 songs